John J. Flikkie (1866–1944), was a member of the Minnesota House of Representatives in the early 1900s.

Career
Flikkie was a member of the House of Representatives from 1917 to 1919. His election was contested, but upheld.

References

Members of the Minnesota House of Representatives
1866 births
1944 deaths
Place of birth missing